Gardna Wielka  (Slovincian: Vjélgå Garnåu;  or Wiôlgô Garnô) is a village in the administrative district of Gmina Smołdzino, within Słupsk County, Pomeranian Voivodeship, in northern Poland.

Before 1945 the area of Farther Pomerania, where the village is located,  was part of Germany. On March 8, 1945, the region was conquested by the Red Army, and after the end of World War II the local populace was expelled to West Germany and the town and district became part of Poland as Powiat słupski. For the history of the region, see History of Pomerania.

The village has a population of 803.

References

Gardna Wielka